Astyanacinus is a genus of characins from South America. The currently recognized species in this genus are:
 Astyanacinus moorii (Boulenger, 1892)
 Astyanacinus multidens N. E. Pearson, 1924
 Astyanacinus platensis Messner, 1962
 Astyanacinus yariguies Torres-Mejia, Hernández & Senechal, 2012

References

Characidae
Taxa named by Carl H. Eigenmann
Fish of South America